The Damascus Gymnasium is a historic school building on Arkansas Highway 285 in Damascus, Arkansas. It is a rustic -story wood-frame structure, with a central clerestory section covered by a gable-on-hip roof, and side wings covered by a shed roof.  The main entrance, on the east side, is sheltered by a gabled porch, with secondary entrances on the south side, each sheltered by a gable roof supported by large brackets.  The gymnasium was built in 1933 with funding support from the Works Progress Administration.

The building was listed on the National Register of Historic Places in 1992.

See also
National Register of Historic Places listings in Van Buren County, Arkansas

References

School buildings on the National Register of Historic Places in Arkansas
National Register of Historic Places in Van Buren County, Arkansas
School buildings completed in 1933
Works Progress Administration in Arkansas
WPA Rustic architecture
1933 establishments in Arkansas
Education in Van Buren County, Arkansas
Rustic architecture in Arkansas
Gyms in the United States